Kustáni or Kustányi was a minor noble family in the Kingdom of Hungary, which first appeared in the late 13th century and had estates and villages mostly in Zala County.

History
The first member of the family was Ladislaus I (fl. 1274), who originated from the Zala branch of the gens (clan) Péc, as the son of Lucas II (also known as Lucas the Great). Ladislaus took his surname after Kustán or Kustány (present-day part of Kehidakustány).

The most notable member of the family was Daniel, who attended the national Diets as a representative of the nobles in the 1440s.

Notable members
 Andrew (fl. 1400–08): a familiaris of Stephen Kanizsai, who served as castellan of Simontornya in 1405
 Daniel (fl. 1399–1444): a participant of the Diet of Hungary
 Gregory: vice-ispán of Borsod County in 1453
 Ladislaus IV: a familiaris of Ladislaus Pető, who served as castellan of Tátika in 1443
 Lucas II: vice-ispán of Zala County around 1455

Known family tree
Ladislaus I (fl. 1274)
Lucas I (fl. 1336–53)
Matthias (fl. 1372)
Andrew (fl. 1400–08)
Ladislaus III (fl. 1372)
Daniel (fl. 1399–1444)
Paul
Ladislaus IV (fl. 1443)
Lucas II (fl. 1455)
Ladislaus II (fl. 1336)

References

Sources